Douglas is an unincorporated community located in Douglas County, Washington, east of Waterville. Established in 1883, it is home to approximately 30 residents.

History 
Douglas was established in 1883, with many families moving from their native towns and settling in a less populated area. They started offering classes 5 years later in 1887. By 1900, the community was housing about 75 residents. A general store was built in 1905, and has become a main attraction since then. In 1909, the Northern Railway’s Mansfield spur line began operation, and trains were running through the community until 1985, when the rails shut down.

References 

Unincorporated communities in Douglas County, Washington
Unincorporated communities in Washington (state)